is a Japanese football player.

Playing career
Nodake was born in Kagoshima Prefecture on December 3, 2000. He joined J3 League club Kagoshima United FC from youth team in 2018.

References

External links

2000 births
Living people
Association football people from Kagoshima Prefecture
Japanese footballers
J2 League players
J3 League players
Kagoshima United FC players
Association football midfielders
People from Kagoshima